Afonso José Maria Basto de Jesus (born 6 January 1998) is a Portuguese futsal player who plays as a defender for Benfica and the Portugal national team.

Honours
Benfica
Taça da Liga: 2019–20

Portugal
FIFA Futsal World Cup: 2021
UEFA Futsal Championship: 2022
Futsal Finalissima: 2022

References

External links

1998 births
Living people
Sportspeople from Lisbon
Futsal defenders
Portuguese men's futsal players
Sporting CP futsal players
S.L. Benfica futsal players